Mosupatsela FM Stereo is a South African community radio station based in c section in Botshabelo (near Bloemfontein), Free State.

Coverage areas 
Bloemfontein
Botshabelo townships A,B,C,D,E,F,G,H,J,K,L,M,N,R,S,U,V,W  Sections
Edenburg
Dewetsdorp
Thaba Nchu
Clocolan
Brandfort
Marquard
Winburg
Petrusburg
Theunissen
Bultfontein
Virginia

Broadcast languages
English
Sesotho
Xhosa
Tswana

Broadcast time
24/7

Target audience
Black community
LSM Groups 1 - 8
Age Group 16 – 49

Programme format
60% Talk
40% Music

Listenership Figures

References

External links
 SAARF Website

Community radio stations in South Africa
Mass media in the Free State (province)
Mangaung